Hedley was a Canadian pop rock band from Vancouver, British Columbia. Their discography comprises seven studio albums - Hedley, Famous Last Words, The Show Must Go, Storms, Wild Life, and Hello, Cageless - one live album - Go with the Show - and twenty-seven singles, with twenty-one made into music videos.

All six of their albums have been certified by Music Canada and have charted in the top ten on the Canadian Albums Chart. Their debut single, "On My Own", reached number one on the Canadian Singles Chart, while nine of their subsequent singles have reached the top 10 of the Billboard Canadian Hot 100 since the 2007 creation of that chart. The band has sold over a million albums and 4 million singles over the past 12 years.

Albums

Studio albums

Compilation albums

Extended plays

Live albums

Singles

2000s

2010s

Promotional singles

Other charted songs

Other appearances

Videography

Video albums
2006: Try This at Home

Music videos

Notes

References

Discographies of Canadian artists